The Rhode Island National Guard consists of the:

Rhode Island Army National Guard 
Rhode Island Air National Guard 
 102nd Information Warfare Squadron
 143d Airlift Wing
 281st Combat Communications Group
 282nd Combat Communications Squadron

See also
Rhode Island Naval Militia
Rhode Island State Guard
Rhode Island Independent Military Organizations

External links
Bibliography of Rhode Island Army National Guard History compiled by the United States Army Center of Military History
Guide to the Office of the Adjutant General Rhode Island National Guard Unit History records and photographs from the Rhode Island State Archives
Guide to the Rhode Island National Guard (RING) 110th Public Affairs Detachment photographs and negatives from the Rhode Island State Archives
National Guard Mobilization for the Mexican Border, 1916 from the Rhode Island State Archives
National Guard Pay Rolls finding aid from the Rhode Island State Archives
Report of National Guard Duty Performed Finding Aid from the Rhode Island State Archives

National Guard (United States)
Military in Rhode Island